S. Leo Chiang is a documentary filmmaker. Born in Taiwan and based in San Francisco, Leo received his MFA in film production from University of Southern California. He lectured in the Social Documentation program at University of California, Santa Cruz, and had been a fellow in the Sundance Institute Documentary Film Program.

His latest film Out Run, co-directed with award-winning filmmaker Johnny Symons, premiered at the Full Frame Documentary Film Festival and won Best Cinematography for a Feature Length Documentary Film at the Los Angeles Asian Pacific Film Festival. His previous documentary, Mr. Cao Goes to Washington, won the Inspiration Award at the 2012 Full Frame Documentary Film Festival. His film, A Village Called Versailles, about the rebuilding and transformation of the Vietnamese American community in post-Katrina New Orleans, was nominated for a national News & Documentary Emmy Award. It picked up eight film festival awards, aired on PBS Independent Lens series, and has been acquired by more than 200 academic and public libraries.

His other films include To You Sweetheart, Aloha (PBS broadcast 2006), One + One (CINE Golden Eagle Award 2002), and Safe Journey. Leo also collaborates with other documentary filmmakers as an editor (True-Hearted Vixen, POV 2001; Recalling Orange County, PBS/VOCES 2006) and as a cameraman (Ask Not, Independent Lens 2009).

Filmography 

 Our Time Machine (2019)
 Out Run (2016)
 Mr. Cao Goes to Washington (2012)
 A Village Called Versailles (2009)
 To You Sweetheart, Aloha (2004)
 Safe Journey (2004) 
 One + One'' (2002)

References

External links 
S. Leo Chiang Website

American documentary filmmakers
American film directors of Taiwanese descent